Don or Donald Walker may refer to:

Don Walker (musician) (born 1951), Australian musician
Don Walker (orchestrator) (1907–1989), American orchestrator
Don Walker (diplomat), on List of ambassadors of New Zealand to Poland
Don Walker (Australian footballer) (1873–1932), Australian rules footballer
Don Walker (footballer, born 1935) (1935–2011), Scottish footballer
Donald Walker (cricketer) (1912–1941), English cricketer
Donald Walker (politician) (1949–2009), American politician
Donald J. Walker, Canadian businessman